Buckhorn Lake State Resort Park is a state park located in the northwest corner of Perry County, Kentucky. The park is adjacent to the northern edge of the Daniel Boone National Forest.

Activities and amenities
Buckhorn Lake: The lake offers swimming, boating and canoeing. Fishermen can angle for muskie, as a large population of the predator fish lives in the lake.
Trails: The self-guided Moonshiner's Hollow Interpretive Trail winds  past 18 learning stations that teach hikers about the geology, flora, and fauna of the area. More experienced hikers may prefer the more difficult Leatherwood Trail, which connects with the Moonshiner's Hollow Trail.
Accommodations: The park offers a 36-room lodge and three cabins, all overlooking Buckhorn Lake.

The park has Elk with Elk viewing tours.

References

External links
Buckhorn Lake State Resort Park Kentucky Department of Parks

State parks of Kentucky
Protected areas of Perry County, Kentucky
Protected areas established in 1964